Thomas Jefferson Farnsworth was the Democratic President of the West Virginia Senate from Upshur County and served from 1883 to 1885.

References

Democratic Party West Virginia state senators
Presidents of the West Virginia State Senate
1829 births
1916 deaths
19th-century American politicians